John Morrison (26 January 1889 – 26 January 1972) was a Scottish professional footballer who made 120 appearances in the Scottish League for Falkirk as a utility player. After his retirement from football, he managed Third Lanark, St Mirren and Airdrieonians. He was nicknamed 'Slasher'.

Personal life 
Morrison served as a private in McCrae's Battalion of the Royal Scots during the First World War.

Career statistics

Player

Manager

Honours

Player 
Falkirk
 Dunedin Cup: 1913–14
 Stirlingshire Cup: 1909–10
 Stirlingshire Consolation Cup: 1906–07, 1907–08
 Falkirk Infirmary Shield: 1906–07, 1908–09, 1912–13

Manager 
Third Lanark
 Scottish League Second Division second-place promotion: 1927–28

St Mirren
 Scottish League Second Division second-place promotion: 1935–36

References 

Scottish footballers
Royal Scots soldiers
Scottish Football League players
McCrae's Battalion
British Army personnel of World War I
Falkirk F.C. players
St Mirren F.C. players
1889 births
1972 deaths
People from Stenhousemuir
Association football utility players
Scottish football managers
Scottish Football League managers
Third Lanark A.C. managers
St Mirren F.C. managers
Airdrieonians F.C. (1878) managers
East Stirlingshire F.C. non-playing staff